A referendum on banning department stores was held in Liechtenstein on 22 August 1937. The proposal was approved by 59.1% of voters.

Results

References

1937 referendums
1937 in Liechtenstein
Referendums in Liechtenstein
August 1937 events